Choi Gi-su (born 11 May 1970) is a South Korean boxer. He competed at the 1992 Summer Olympics and the 2000 Summer Olympics.

References

1970 births
Living people
Place of birth missing (living people)
South Korean male boxers
Olympic boxers of South Korea
Boxers at the 1992 Summer Olympics
Boxers at the 2000 Summer Olympics
Asian Games silver medalists for South Korea
Asian Games medalists in boxing
Boxers at the 2002 Asian Games
Medalists at the 2002 Asian Games
Light-heavyweight boxers
20th-century South Korean people
21st-century South Korean people